The Coupe d'Aviation Maritime Jacques Schneider, also known as the Schneider Trophy, Schneider Prize or (incorrectly) the Schneider Cup is a trophy that was awarded annually (and later, biennially) to the winner of a race for seaplanes and flying boats. The Schneider Trophy is now held at the Science Museum, South Kensington, London.

Announced in 1912 by Jacques Schneider, a French financier, balloonist and aircraft enthusiast, the competition offered a prize of approximately £1,000. The race was held twelve times between 1913 and 1931. The contests were staged as time trials, with aircraft setting off individually at set intervals, usually 15 minutes apart. The contests were very popular and some attracted crowds of over 200,000 spectators.

The race was significant in advancing aeroplane design, particularly in the fields of aerodynamics and engine design, and would show its results in the best fighters of World War II. The streamlined shape and the low drag, liquid-cooled engine pioneered by Schneider Trophy designs are obvious in the British Supermarine Spitfire, the American North American P-51 Mustang, and the Italian Macchi C.202 Folgore.

An earlier 1910 trophy for landplanes presented by Jacques Schneider, in France, the Grande Semaine d'Aviation de Tours, now in the possession of the RAF College Cranwell, is also known as the Schneider Cup.

Rules

If an aero club won three races in five years, they would retain the trophy and the winning pilot would receive 75,000 francs for each of the first three wins. Each race was hosted by the previous winning country. The races were supervised by the Fédération Aéronautique Internationale and the aero club in the hosting country. Each club could enter up to three competitors with an equal number of alternatives.

Trophy
The Schneider Trophy is a sculpture of silver and bronze set on a marble base. It depicts a zephyr skimming the waves, and a nude winged figure is seen kissing a zephyr recumbent on a breaking wave. The heads of two other zephyrs and of Neptune, the god of the Sea, can be seen surrounded by octopus and crabs. The symbolism represents speed conquering the elements of sea and air. The cost of the trophy was 25,000 francs.

The trophy itself has been entrusted to the Royal Aero Club and can be viewed along with the winning Supermarine S.6B floatplane at the London Science Museum Flight exhibition hall. Supermarine S.6, N248, which competed in the 1929 contest but was disqualified, is preserved at Solent Sky maritime museum in Southampton.

History
Schneider was a hydroplane racer who came from a wealthy family; his interest in aircraft began after he met Wilbur Wright in 1908, but a boating accident in 1910 crippled him and prematurely ended his racing and flying career. Schneider served as a race referee at the Monaco Hydroplane Meet in 1912, where he noted that seaplane development was lagging land-based aircraft; seeking to spur amphibious aircraft development, capable of reliable operation, extended range, and reasonable payload capacity, he announced the annual Schneider Trophy competition at a race banquet on December 5, to cover a distance of at least .

The first competition was held on 16 April 1913, at Monaco, consisting of six laps,  distance in total. Although Prévost had averaged a faster flying speed, he lost 50 minutes when he landed prematurely after losing count of the laps completed. All four entrants were flying French-made aircraft; two withdrew before completing the race. The United States and Germany failed to qualify. From 1915 to 1918, competition was suspended for the duration of World War I.

After the war, the competition resumed in 1919 at Bournemouth where in foggy conditions the Italian team won. They were later disqualified and the race was voided, as the referees ruled they had incorrectly flown around a marker buoy. In 1920 and 1921 at Venice the Italians won again; in 1920 no other nation entered and in 1921 the French entry did not start.  Had it not been for the 1919 disqualification, Italy would have been awarded the trophy permanently. After 1921, an additional requirement was added: the winning seaplane had to remain moored to a buoy for six hours without human intervention.

In 1922 in Naples the British and French competed with the Italians. The British private entry, a Supermarine Sea Lion II, was the victor, flown by Henry Biard. The French aircraft did not start the race, which became a competition between the Sea Lion and three Italian aircraft, two Macchi M.17s and a Savoia S.51.

Nationalism

The 1923 trophy, contested at Cowes, went to the Americans with a sleek, liquid-cooled engined craft designed by Glenn Curtiss. It used the Curtiss D-12 engine. US Navy Lieutenant David Rittenhouse won the cup, and his teammate Rutledge Irvine was second in an identical aircraft. The British Sea Lion III (flown by 1922 winner Henry Biard), and the French entry withdrew from the race. The preparation of the United States team, backed by government support and using Curtiss racing biplanes derived from inter-military competitions, increased the speed and the investment of a winning entry significantly. In 1924 the competition was cancelled as no other nation turned out to face the Americans: the Italians and the French withdrew; and both British craft crashed in pre-race trials. In 1925 at Chesapeake Bay the Americans won again, with US pilot Jimmy Doolittle winning in a Curtiss R3C ahead of the British Gloster III and the Italian Macchi M.33. Two British planes did not compete (R. J. Mitchell's Supermarine S.4 and the other Gloster III were damaged before the race). Two of the American planes did not finish.

Benito Mussolini instructed the Italian aircraft industry to "win the Schneider Trophy at all costs" and so demonstrate the effectiveness of his Fascist government. In 1926, the Italians returned with a Macchi M.39 and won against the Americans with a  run at Hampton Roads. The United States, short of funds, did not develop new aircraft for the 1926 title defence; the M.39, designed by Mario Castoldi, used a Fiat AS2 engine and was streamlined in the manner of the 1925 Supermarine and Curtiss entrants. The American teams withdrew from further competition after the 1926 race, as the military were unwilling to fund entrants. In 1927 at Venice the British responded by enlisting government backing and RAF pilots (the High Speed Flight) for the Supermarine, Gloster, and Shorts entries. Supermarine's Mitchell-designed S.5s took first and second places; no other entrants finished. The race was witnessed by an estimated 250,000 spectators. 1927 was the last annual competition, the event then moving to a biennial schedule to allow for more development time under mutual agreement.

Both Britain and Italy entered two new aircraft and a backup plane from the previous race. Three of the four new aircraft were disqualified (Supermarine S.6 N.248) or failed to finish the course (both Macchi M.67s), with the older Macchi M.52R taking second and Supermarine S.5 taking third. Although France had ordered racing seaplanes from Bernard and Nieuport-Delage in 1928, they were unable to complete them in time for the 1929 race.

The UK win

In 1931 the British government withdrew support, but a private donation of £100,000 from the wealthy and ultra-patriotic Lucy, Lady Houston, allowed Supermarine to compete. When the French and Italian teams dropped out, leaving no other competitors, the British team flew the course alone on 13 September and won the coveted Schneider Trophy outright, having beaten the time record from the 1929 competition. Reportedly half a million spectators lined the beachfronts. The Italian, French, and German entrants failed to ready their aircraft in time for the competition.

Although the British team had secured the trophy for the UK permanently with the 1931 uncontested win, development of the other 1931 entrants continued. The proposed Italian entrant (the Macchi M.C.72), which had pulled out of the contest due to engine problems, later went on to set two new world speed records with the help of British fuel expert Rod Banks, who had worked on the Rolls Royce R engine of the S6B. Both times the plane was piloted by Francesco Agello. This speed remains the fastest speed ever attained by a piston-engined seaplane.

For a complete list of the aircraft which competed in the competitions, see List of Schneider Trophy aircraft.

Winners

Alumni
Reginald J. Mitchell, designer of the winning Supermarine Schneider Trophy entrants, also designed the Supermarine Spitfire.
Mario Castoldi, designer of the 1926 winner, the Macchi M.39, also designed other contestants such as the M.52, the M.52R, the M.67, and the M.C.72. After the M.C.72 Castoldi designed some of the Italian fighters which flew during World War II, such as the MC.202.
James Doolittle, winning pilot of the 1925 race, was accomplished in many other areas. He led the famous "Doolittle Raid", an American bombing attack on several Japanese homeland targets in April 1942.

1981 revival
In 1981 the race was revived, in name if not in concept, by the Royal Aero Club of Great Britain to commemorate the 50th anniversary of Britain's ultimate retention of the Schneider Trophy. Pilots had to have a minimum of 100 hours as pilot-in-command, and a valid air racing licence.

Following that event, the UK subsidiary of US computer company Digital Equipment Corporation (DEC) independently decided to sponsor a long-term revival of the Schneider Trophy, with the first race held in 1984. The idea was submitted by DEC's then UK PR consultancy Infopress as part of a broader commercial sponsorship programme designed to increase DEC's presence in the UK market at that time. DEC sponsored this revived race series from 1984 until 1991, which also marked the diamond jubilee of the final race in the original series. DEC and Infopress turned to the expertise of the Royal Aero Club's Records, Racing & Rally Association which again administered and ran the actual races. The 1981 Solent course, itself a close approximation of the original 1929 and 1931 Schneider Trophy courses over the Solent, was also used and adapted from year to year.

This sponsorship had a profound effect on the awareness and popularity of handicapped air racing in the UK and further afield, as well as markedly increasing DEC's commercial profile in the UK. The appeal of the race, its historic connections, and the fact that prize money was now on offer, meant that the entry list for the race was large enough to warrant the introduction of heats from 1985 onwards. (The 1984 race field was 62 entrants, believed at the time to be the largest-ever in all forms of air racing.)

The event received further boosts in 1986, when it was started by HRH Prince Andrew and his then fiancée Sarah Ferguson; in 1987, when the event was featured as one episode in a BBC television documentary series; and in 1988, when it was a central part of that year's ITV Telethon Appeal.

DEC invited customers and partners to each year's event as guests, and the general public watched in increasing numbers as the series grew in size and popularity.

For the pilots taking part, the event became, along with the King's Cup air race, the highlight of the UK's air racing season, and regularly attracted entrants from continental Europe.

DEC continued to sponsor the races through 1991. Since that time, the race has been run by the Royal Aero Club Records Racing and Rally Association along with the King's Cup and the British air racing championship. The venue has varied but is still flown on most occasions around a Solent-based course, usually around September of each year.

Revival winners

In popular culture
The Schneider Cup is frequently referred to in the 1992 animated film Porco Rosso, even to the extent of director Hayao Miyazaki's naming the film's antagonist Donald Curtiss, a reference to American aircraft designers Glenn Curtiss and Donald Douglas.
In the song "Bill Hosie" by Archie Fisher, the protagonist rebuilds a Supermarine S.5 seaplane that survived the 1927 Schneider Trophy Race. The plane, race, and trophy are referred to throughout the song. (Bill Hosie and the replica were both real. Hosie competed in the 1985 and 1986 DEC Schneider Trophy Races, and DEC partly financed his rebuild of the S.5 replica. He crashed during a test-flight of this replica on 23 May 1987, near Mylor, Cornwall in the UK, just one month before that year's DEC Schneider Trophy Race. Hosie was killed. Details of the crash and its cause are in AIB Bulletin 9/87 published by the Accidents Investigation Branch of the UK's Department of Transport, 1987.)
The film The First of the Few (1942) starring Leslie Howard as R. J. Mitchell centres on Mitchell's life as the designer of multiple Schneider Trophy–winning seaplanes and then the Spitfire fighter plane.

See also

 List of aviation awards
 Gordon Bennett Trophy (aeroplanes)
 National Air Races

References

Bibliography
 Barker, Ralph. The Schneider Trophy Races. Shrewsbury, UK: Airlife Publishing Ltd., 1981. 
 Eves, Edward. The Schneider Trophy Story. Shrewsbury, UK: Airlife Publishing Ltd., 2001.  
 Gunston, Bill. World Encyclopaedia of Aero Engines. Cambridge, UK: Patrick Stephens Limited, 1989. 
 
 Lewis, Julian. Racing Ace - The Fights and Flights of 'Kink' Kinkead DSO DSC* DFC*. Barnsley, UK: Pen & Sword, 2011. 

 Mondey, David. The Schneider Trophy. London, UK: Robert Hale, 1975. 
 Shelton, John. Schneider Trophy to Spitfire - The Design Career of R.J. Mitchell.  Yeovil, UK: Haynes Publishing, 2008. 
 Schofield, H. M. High Speed and Other Flights. London, UK. John Hamilton Limited. (Schofield was a member of the 1927 British Schneider Trophy team.)
 Orlebar, A. H. Schneider Trophy. London, UK. Seeley Service & Co. Limited. (Orlebar was the commanding office of the 1929 and 1931 British Schneider Trophy teams.)
 Smith, Alan. Schneider Trophy Diamond Jubilee, Looking Back 60 Years. Poole, UK. Waterfront Publications, 1991. .
 James, Derek N. Schneider Trophy Aircraft 1913-1931. London, UK. Putnam & Company Limited, 1991.

Further reading
 Jane's Encyclopedia of Aviation (1989) has an extensive article on the Schneider Trophy (pp. 794–797).
 Baldrey, Dennis & Jerram, Mike. The DEC Schneider Trophy Race. London, UK. Osprey Publishing Limited, 1988.

External links

 "Schneider Contest 1931" (Course layout and general regulations)Flight the Aircraft Engineer and Airships, No. 1181, Vol. XXIII, No. 33, 14 August 1931
 Schneider Trophy web site
 Royal Air Force official web page on the Schneider Trophy (archive)
 SPEEDBIRDS Graphics study on the Schneider Trophy planes
Newsreel footage of Macchi M.39 and Major Mario de Bernardi after winning the 1926 Schneider Trophy race 
Newsreel footage of 1929 Schneider Trophy racing teams, British Supermarine S.6A aircraft (#2 and #8), and Italian Macchi M.67 (#10) and Macchi M.52R (#4) aircraft at 1929 Schneider Trophy race 
The Schneider Cup racers

 
Air races
Aviation awards